Asad Ali Toor or Asad Toor is a Pakistani journalist. He currently reports from the Supreme Court of Pakistan. He has also worked as a producer for the Aaj News. He used to be a critic of the Establishment.

Journalistic career 

On the evening of 25 May 2021, Asad Ali was tied up, beaten and ambushed inside his apartment in Islamabad by three unidentified men. According to Sheikh Rasheed the Interior Minister, that Nadra, FIA, and police are investigating the case, and close to identifying the accused.

Protest
Journalists' organizations protested outside the National Press Club against the attack. Toor was supported by journalist's unions, media organizations and media personals including Hamid Mir. Mir was banned by Geo News from his show Capital Talk.

References

Year of birth missing (living people)
Pakistani journalists
Living people
Pakistani male journalists